Yuri Nikolayevich Korolyov (born 25 August 1962 in Vladimir) is a Soviet artistic gymnast who competed during the 1980s, winning many World and European Medals. Part of a deep Soviet team that, throughout the 1980s, featured such names as Dmitry Bilozerchev, Valeri Liukin, Vladimir Artemov, Valentin Mogilny and others, Korolyov still managed to distinguish himself for the greater part of the decade by becoming World All-Around Champion in 1981 and 1985, as well as being World Cup All-Around Co-Champion (with Li Ning) in 1986, among many other titles and medals.

1981–1984
As Korolyov had been winning many titles and medals for years as a Junior at such competitions as the Jr. USSR Championships and Jr. European Championships, it was no surprise that his senior debut in 1981 would be quite major. At that year's European Championships in Rome, where he became the first gymnast to compete a triple back dismount from the Rings as well as a full-twisting double layout dismount from the High Bar, he won the silver medal in the Individual All-Around, as well as taking 4 out of a possible 6 event finals medals – 2 gold and 2 silver. He was no less successful at that year's World Championships in Moscow, where his consistent, strong performances (highest 6-event composite score in the team compulsory segment of the competition, highest 12-event composite score throughout both segments of the team composition) won him the All-Around Champion title. He was the youngest Men's World All-Around Artistic Gymnastics Champion up to that point.

The next year, he continued to be the first, or among the first, male gymnasts to successfully compete certain yet more difficult moves, such as doing a handstand in the middle of a Pommel Horse routine as well as doing consecutive repetitions of the Tkatchev release move on High Bar, at the 1982 World Gymnastics Cup in Zagreb, Yugoslavia where yet more strong performances helped him to 3rd place in the All-Around competition behind Chinese gymnasts Li Ning (1st) and Tong Fei (2nd). He would also take 5 out of a possible 6 medals in the event finals (Parallel Bars title, plus 3 silvers and a bronze).

1983 was not as good a year for Korolyov as the previous 2 had been. He did manage to place 2nd to Bilozerchev in the All-Around at that year's European Championships in Varna, as well as winning 2 event titles (Floor, shared with Plamen Petkov of Bulgaria, and Parallel Bars). But a disastrous performance on high bar (score of 8.85) in the team compulsories segment of competition at that year's World Championships in Budapest dropped him to 5th on the Soviet team, although his 6-event team composite score in team optionals was second, among his teammates, to Bilozerchev's. Not being among the top 3 men on his team, he did not qualify to the Individual All-Around Final, nor did he win a medal on any of the 3 individual event finals to which he qualified. Interesting to note is that although the Soviet team was able to throw out Korolyov's 8.85 High Bar score (their other 5 scores were all 9.7 or above), they still lost the World Team Title to China by only .100 (a very small margin in a team competition), and this was the only World or Olympic Team title the Soviet men would lose at a non-boycotted World Championships or Olympics from 1979 to 1992.

In 1984, any hopes Korolyov would have realistically entertained about any Olympic successes were dashed by the Soviet-led boycott, and then his father's death prevented him from participating in the Alternate Olympics that year.

1985–1988

The beginning of this quadrennium saw Korolyov make an impressive resurgence back onto the international competitive scene as he clinched the All-Around title by a large margin of .300 over Soviet teammate Vladimir Artemov at the 1985 World Championships in Montreal. With Bilozerchev (who had won the European All-Around Title earlier that year) unfortunately sidelined because of a severe leg injury sustained in a car accident, Korolyov had more free rein to collect medals at this competition, where he also won 3 of the 6 individual event titles.

Like the midpoint year in the preceding quadrennium, 1986 was another stellar year for Korolyov, as he won or co-won the All-Around at that year's 2 most significant international competitions. At that year's World Cup in Beijing, he shared the All-Around title with Li Ning, and came back to best the home-country-advantaged Li in the individual event finals winning 3 golds and 2 silvers vs. Li's 2 golds and 1 bronze. Also, that year, at the first Goodwill Games in Moscow, among a deep international field, Korolyov won the All-Around title again by a huge margin of .600 over compatriot Artemov. He logged the highest 6-event composite score in the preliminaries as well as again in the All-Around final, truly dominating the competition. That dominance stretched over into event finals as well where he snared 3 out of the 6 individual event titles.

1987 saw Korolyov even better-poised to go into the succeeding year's Olympics than at the same point in time in the previous quadrennium. Despite the very successful return of Bilozerchev and the rise of younger Soviet stars such as Valeri Liukin and Valentin Mogilny, Korolyov still managed to win his 3rd European All-Around Silver Medal, behind Liukin, at that year's competition in Moscow, adding to that 1 gold and 1 silver in event finals. Even more impressive was his performance at the 1987 World Gymnastics Championships in Rotterdam. Although Korolyov only qualified 4th among his Soviet teammates, compatriate Liukin had to withdraw from the Individual All-Around because of an unfortunate knee injury, freeing Korolyov to compete in the All-Around final where he placed 2nd behind Bilozerchev and, buttressed by a perfect score of 10.00 on vault, even logged a higher 6-event composite score in the all-around final than Bilozerchev (or anybody else). (Under the New Life rules instituted two years later, he would have been World All-Around Champion.)

With the previous year's successes established, it looked like Korolyov would have another chance to finally prove himself on the world's biggest stage, the Olympics, but fate adversely intervened again when he injured his Achilles tendon, making his bid for the 1988 Seoul Olympics impossible.

After 1988

In 1989, incredibly, Korolyov kept competing. He almost made that year's World Championship team for the Soviets, but with yet more up-and comers in the Soviet system like Vitaly Marinich and Valery Belenky, he placed 7th at that year's USSR Championships and then retired.

The most decorated non-Olympian in gymnastics?

Korolyov is, quite arguably, the most decorated non-Olympian (male or female) gymnast of all time.

With a total of 34 individual medals at World Championships, World Cups, and European Championships competitions, Korolyov has more such medals than any other non-Olympian with Valentin Mogilny (17) being the next highest in this sort of medal count. Even stretching this medal count to include individual Olympic (Official or ‘Alternate’) medals, Korolyov's medal haul is tied with Alexander Dityatin for 3rd all-time for men behind Vitaly Scherbo (51) and Nikolai Andrianov (48). The non-Olympian woman gymnasts with the highest such medal hauls are the deceased 1978 World All-Around Champion Elena Mukhina, with 13, and her Soviet compatriot, 1985 World All-Around Co-Champion Oksana Omelianchik, with 11.
His World Championship and World Cup individual medals tally of 21 is also far higher than any other non-Olympian with Valentin Mogilny being second.
Even going strictly by individual World Championship individual medals alone, Korolyov has more (9) than any other non-Olympian, with Mogilny being the runner-up again with 6.
Korolyov's 8 European / World Championship / World Cup / Olympic All-Around medals is the 3rd highest ever among men, behind Scherbo and Andrianov who each have 9. Korolyov's 8 such All-Around medals also makes him the most prolific All-Around Medalist of the 1980s.
Korolyov's 21 individual World Championship and World Cup medals is the 2nd highest all-time among all male or female gymnasts, surpassed only by Scherbo's 26. Among these, 11 were gold and that, again, is surpassed, among all male or female non-Olympian gymnasts, only by Scherbo's 13.
On WorldGymRank's list of the “50 Greatest Gymnasts of Our Time”, Yuri Korolyov is 8th all-time among the men in this weighted, sophisticated, deeply detailed, gymnast ranking system, a higher ranking in that system than any other male or female non-Olympian gymnast.

References

1962 births
Living people
People from Vladimir, Russia
Sportspeople from Vladimir Oblast
Honoured Masters of Sport of the USSR
Recipients of the Order of the Red Banner of Labour
Russian male artistic gymnasts
Soviet male artistic gymnasts
World champion gymnasts
European champions in gymnastics
Medalists at the World Artistic Gymnastics Championships
Universiade medalists in gymnastics
Universiade gold medalists for the Soviet Union
Universiade bronze medalists for the Soviet Union
Competitors at the 1986 Goodwill Games